The Switzerland cricket team toured Luxembourg in June 2022 to play two Twenty20 International (T20I) matches at the Pierre Werner Cricket Ground in Walferdange. A friendly match was played the following day after the T20Is. The series provided both sides with preparation for the  2022 ICC Men's T20 World Cup Europe sub-regional qualifier tournaments.

Luxembourg won the first T20I by 18 runs, before Switzerland won the second game by 78 runs, with the series therefore shared 1–1.

Squads

T20I series

1st T20I

2nd T20I

References

External links
 Series home at ESPN Cricinfo

Associate international cricket competitions in 2022